This is a List of Pakistani writers, writers of fiction and nonfiction who are native to, or born in Pakistan, writing in any language.



A

B

 Badam Natawan
Bano Qudsia
Bapsi Sidhwa
Begum Akhtar Riazuddin
Bina Shah
Bushra Rahman

C

Chaudhry Afzal Haq
Colonel Muhammad Khan

D

Daniyal Mueenuddin
Daud Kamal

E

F

G

Ghulam Hassan Lobsang
 Ghulam Muhammad Girami, Maulana
Ghulam Muhammad Qasir

H

I

J
 Janbaz Mirza
 Jazib Qureshi
 Javed Ahmad Ghamidi

K

M

N

 Nabi Bux Khan Baloch
Naseem Hijazi
 Naseem Thebo
Nasir Kazmi
 Noorul Huda Shah

O

Allamah Kaukab Noorani Okarvi
Osman Khalid Butt

P

Patras Bokhari
Partawi Shah

Q

Qudrat Ullah Shahab
Qurat-ul-Ain Haider

R

Raees Warsi
Rahim Gul
Rasheed Ahmed Siddique
Rashid Sabir

S

T

Tahir Alauddin
Tahir Naqvi
Tehmina Durrani
Tarique Ashraf
Tariq Ali

U

Usman Peerzada

W

Wasif Ali Wasif
Wazir Agha

Y

Yusuf Hussain Abadi

Z

See also 
 List of Pakistani poets
 List of Urdu-language poets

Pakistani